Samuel Simco Gason (2 June 1845, Adelaide–11 Apr 1897, Gibsons Camp) was an early settler of the Flinders Ranges described as having had a colourful contribution to early South Australian history.

Mount Gason on the Northern Territory/South Australian Border is named after him.

References

Settlers of Australia
1845 births
1897 deaths